The 4th constituency of Isère is one of ten French legislative constituencies in the Isère département.

It was defined in 1986 to cover the then cantons of de Bourg-d'Oisans, Clelles, Corps, Fontaine-Seyssinet, Mens, Monestier-de-Clermont, La Mure, Valbonnais, Vif and Villard-de-Lans.

Deputies

Election Results

2022

 
 
 
 
|-
| colspan="8" bgcolor="#E9E9E9"|
|-

2017

2012

2010 by-election

Following the appointment of Didier Migaud as the head of the Court of Audit, a by-election was held on Sunday, May 30 and June 6, 2010.

2007

 
 
 
 
 
 
 
|-
| colspan="8" bgcolor="#E9E9E9"|
|-

2002

 
 
 
 
 
 
|-
| colspan="8" bgcolor="#E9E9E9"|
|-

1997

 
 
 
 
 
 
 
|-
| colspan="8" bgcolor="#E9E9E9"|
|-

References

4